Andrii Demchuk (born 14 December 1987) is a Ukrainian wheelchair fencer who competes in épée, foil and sabre. He represented Ukraine at the 2016 Summer Paralympics and he won the gold medal in the men's sabre A event. He also represented Ukraine at the 2012 Summer Paralympics without winning a medal.

In the November 2019 event of the IWAS Wheelchair Fencing World Cup he won the silver medal in the men's sabre A event.

References

External links 

 

Living people
1987 births
Ukrainian male épée fencers
Paralympic wheelchair fencers of Ukraine
Paralympic gold medalists for Ukraine
Wheelchair fencers at the 2012 Summer Paralympics
Wheelchair fencers at the 2016 Summer Paralympics
Medalists at the 2016 Summer Paralympics
Paralympic medalists in wheelchair fencing
Ukrainian male foil fencers
Ukrainian male sabre fencers
21st-century Ukrainian people